Tully Mountain may refer to: